The 1940 State of the Union Address was given by the 32nd president of the United States, Franklin D. Roosevelt, on Wednesday, January 3, 1940, to both houses of 76th United States Congress.  It was given after World War II had begun, but before the fall of France, and about a year before the United States entered the war..  He said, "You are well aware that dictatorships--and the philosophy of force that justifies and accompanies dictatorships--have originated in almost every case in the necessity for drastic action to improve internal conditions in places where democratic action for one reason or another has failed to respond to modern needs and modern demands."

See also 
 1940 United States presidential election

References 

State of the Union addresses
Speeches by Franklin D. Roosevelt
Presidency of Franklin D. Roosevelt
76th United States Congress
State of the Union Address
State of the Union Address
State of the Union Address
State of the Union Address
January 1940 events